Phyllonorycter rhododendrella is a moth of the family Gracillariidae. It is known from Tennessee, United States.

The larvae feed on Rhododendron carolinianum and Rhododendron punctatum. They mine the leaves of their host plant. The mine has the form of a large tentiform mine.

References

rhododendrella
Moths of North America
Moths described in 1935